László Hartmann (Hungarian: Hartmann László; 17 August 1901 – 16 May 1938) was a Hungarian Grand Prix motor racing driver.

Despite showing little aptitude behind the wheel while training for his road licence, Hartmann went on to become one of Hungary's leading competition drivers of the pre-World War II period. He began his racing career in the late 1920s, driving his own privately entered Hupmobile in local circuit and hillclimb events. He soon graduated to a true racing car, buying a Bugatti Type 35B from compatriot Count Tivadar Zichy in 1929. With this and another of his own Bugattis – a Type 37A sports car bought in 1930 – he began to enter more prestigious and challenging European events in addition to those in his home country. Hartmann regularly featured in the top five finishers at most European hillclimb events in the following few years, and in 1930 he took second place overall in the European Mountain Championship series. His performances caught the Bugatti factory's eye and they occasionally lent him a more powerful Type 51, with which he won the hillclimb events at Guggenberg in 1932 and 1933. In addition to racing against the clock Hartmann also participated in a number of Grand Prix circuit races during this period, never failing to finish in the top 10 when mechanical maladies or accidents didn't prevent him from finishing at all.

For 1935 Hartmann decided to switch his allegiance to the Italian manufacturer Maserati and replaced his Bugattis with a Maserati 8CM, that he painted in the national red, white and green racing colours of Hungary. It was with this car that year that Hartmann recorded some of the best international circuit racing results of his career: third place in the Grand Prix du Comminges, and fourth place in the Grand Prix des Frontières. He retained the 8CM into 1936, but part way through 1937 he decided to upgrade to a Maserati 6C 34, direct from the Maserati factory and formerly driven by the Italian superstar Tazio Nuvolari. Again he posted respectable top class results for a privateer entrant, but by this time the German state-funded Silver Arrows program was beginning to take a stranglehold on European racing leaving only the lower positions as realistic targets for individuals such as Hartmann. Away from the Grand Prix circus Hartmann continued to score well and occasionally win in the lesser voiturette and hillclimb events. His successes even prompted the Maserati works team to offer him a few drives as a semi-works entry, earning a salary for his racing for the first time.

Hartmann's reputation was growing and his prospects were brightening, but sadly for him his first major race of the 1938 Grand Prix season would prove to be his last. The 1938 Tripoli Grand Prix was unusual in that instead of running the Grand Prix cars and the slower voiturette cars in separate events the fields were combined into one race. There was much confusion at the start as some of the voiturette cars were moving before the flag fell, resulting in a mixed field of fast and slower cars on the approach to the fast first corner. This confusion continued throughout the race, with the speed differential between the two classes causing a number of accidents, including a fatal crash for Italian Alfa Romeo works driver Eugenio Siena. On Hartmann's 11th lap his Maserati 4CM voiturette was caught by the Grand Prix-class Alfa Romeo 312 of Giuseppe Farina, well over a lap ahead already. As the Italian made to lap Hartmann for a second time their cars touched wheels, sending them both rolling off the race track. Both drivers were thrown from their vehicles, and although Farina escaped with only cuts and bruises Hartmann's spine was broken. He died during the early hours of the following morning, in hospital. After a short ceremony at the circuit Hartmann's body was flown back to Hungary, and he was buried in Budapest's Rákoskeresztúr Cemetery.

Complete European Championship results

References

External links
 Totalcar Magazine: A forgotten hero 

1901 births
1938 deaths
Hungarian racing drivers
Grand Prix drivers
Racing drivers who died while racing
Sport deaths in Libya
European Championship drivers